Christian Pedersen (17 September 1920 – 24 November 1999) was a Danish cyclist. He competed in the individual and team road race events at the 1948 Summer Olympics.

References

External links
 

1920 births
1999 deaths
Danish male cyclists
Olympic cyclists of Denmark
Cyclists at the 1948 Summer Olympics
People from Horsens
Sportspeople from the Central Denmark Region